Kirsten Kappert-Gonther (born 3 November 1966) is a German psychotherapist and politician of Alliance 90/The Greens. Since the 2017 German federal election, she has been a member of the Bundestag, the federal parliament of Germany. She did not win the constituency mandate in Bremen I, but was elected via the Bremen state list.

Early life and education
Kappert-Gonther was born in Marburg and grew up in Bochum. She later studied medicine at the University of Marburg and in Brisbane, training to become a psychiatrist and psychotherapist.

Political career
From 2011 to 2017 Kappert-Gonther was a member of the Bürgerschaft of Bremen.

Kappert-Gonther has been a member of the German Bundestag since the 2017 elections, representing Bremen. In parliament, she has since been serving on the Health Committee. In that capacity, she focuses on drug policy, arguing for the legalisation of cannabis.

In September 2019, Kappert-Gonther challenged incumbents Katrin Göring-Eckardt and Anton Hofreiter and announced her candidacy to chair the Green parliamentary group, together with Cem Özdemir.

Other activities 
 Greenpeace, Member
 World Wide Fund for Nature (WWF), Member

References

External links
Personal homepage

1966 births
Living people
German psychotherapists
German women psychiatrists
German psychiatrists
Members of the Bundestag 2021–2025
Members of the Bundestag 2017–2021
Members of the Bundestag for Alliance 90/The Greens
Members of the Bundestag for Bremen
University of Marburg alumni
21st-century German women